Hélder is a given name in Portuguese. The unrelated German-Jewish surname "Helder" is also given the accent in Portuguese, such as the Portuguese poet Herberto Hélder (1930-).

The name is sometimes confused with Heitor. People named Hélder include:

 Hélder Fragueiro Antunes, a Portugues-American executive
 Hélder Barbosa (born 1987), Portuguese footballer 
 Hélder Cabral (born 1984), Portuguese footballer
 Hélder Catalão (born 1955), Portuguese footballer
 Hélder Cristóvão (born 1971), Angola-born Portuguese footballer, often just called Hélder
 Hélder Costa (born 1994), Angola-born Portuguese footballer
 Hélder Costa (playwright) (born 1939), Portuguese dramatist, formerly exiled in Paris
 Hélder Muianga (born 1976), Mozambican football player
 Hélder Esteves (born 1977), Portuguese football striker
 Helder Francisco Malauene, Mozambican politician
 Hélder Macedo (born 1935), Portuguese literary scholar and writer
 Hélder Maurílio (born 1988), Brazilian footballer
 Hélder Prista Monteiro (1922–1994), Portuguese absurdist playwright
 Hélder Graça Neto (born 1982), Angolan footballer 
 Hélder Postiga (born 1982), Portuguese footballer
 Hélder Lima Queiroz (born 1963), Brazilian zoologist
 Hélder Rosário (born 1980), Portuguese footballer
 Hélder Ribeiro Silva (born 1991), Brazilian footballer

See also
Helder (disambiguation)

References

Portuguese masculine given names